Yuri Petrovich Korshunov (22 September 1933, Chernorechka Village near Novosibirsk — 1 August 2002, Novosibirsk) was a Russian entomologist who specialised in Lepidoptera.
Korshunov was a scientific worker of the Zoological Museum in the Institute of Systematics and Ecology of Animals (Siberian branch of Russian Academy of Sciences).

He wrote Butterflies of the Western Siberian Plain. A key (1985), A catalogue of Rhopalocera (Lepidoptera) of the USSR (1972), The Butterflies of Asian part of Russia (1995, co-author P. Gorbunov), Butterflies of the Urals, Siberia and Far East. Key and annotations (2000), parts of the Red Data Book of the Russian Federation and many other works. He was a Member of the Russian Entomological Society.

References

External links
 In Memoriam site Very extensive. Bibliography etc.
 
 
 
 

1933 births
2002 deaths
Soviet entomologists
Soviet lepidopterists
Russian lepidopterists
National University of Kharkiv alumni
Scientists from Novosibirsk
Burials at Zayeltsovskoye Cemetery